Yuri Viktorovich Syomin (born 7 February 1968) is a former Russian football player.

External links
 

1968 births
Living people
Soviet footballers
Russian footballers
Association football midfielders
Russian Premier League players
FC Lada-Tolyatti players
PFC Krylia Sovetov Samara players
FC Mordovia Saransk players
FC Volga Ulyanovsk players